Museo Civico di Teramo (Italian for Civic Museum of Teramo)  is an art museum in Teramo, Abruzzo.

History
The museum collections mainly derived from suppressed ecclesiastic institutions during the years 1868 and 1888. Initially, the works were displayed in a palace next to the church of Sant'Anna. The discovery of ancient Roman items in town, expanded the collections.

Collections
Among the works on display are:

Madonna del Melograno by Giacomo da Campli
Saints Bonaventure and Sebastian by Master of the Crivelleschi polyptych
Saints Jerome and Francis by an anonymous local painter
Madonna and Child by an anonymous local painter
Crucifixion by a follower of Pietro Damini
Pope Eleuterius consigns document of excommunication to  Bishop Francesco Chiericati Veneto-lombard school
Original Sin by Paolo De Matteis
Jesus and the Samaritan by Venetian school
Last Supper a copy of a Joos van Cleve painting
Madonna of Rosary and Saints by Francesco Solimena
Madonna and Child by Francesco de Mura
Magdalen (anonymous Neapolitan)
Baptism of Constantine by Sebastiano Conca
Madonna and Child and St Anne a copy of a Carlo Saraceni painting
Amore and Psyche by Candlelight Master
Faun by a follower of Pier Francesco Mola
Still Life by anonymous lombard painter
Still Life and flowers by a follower of Giuseppe Recco
Still Life by Aniello Ascione
Battle scene by Francesco Antonio Simonini
Decoration by Corrado Giaquinto
Papessa Giovanna by Angelo Caroselli
Seascape by Leonardo Coccorante
Veduta with ruins by Leonardo Coccorante
Portrait of ecclesiastic by Benedetto Gennari 
Portrait of nobleman, attributed to Jacob Ferdinand Voet
Self-portrait by Giuseppe Bonolis
Portrait by Gennaro Della Monica
Four Seasons by Pasquale Celommi
Political operator by Pasquale Celommi
Palazzo Donn'Anna by Gaetano Esposito
Contadina con falce by Basilio Cascella
Preparing flag by Cesare Averardi
Portrait of Sister Gemma by Cesare Averardi
Contemplation by Raffaello Celommi
Leaving to Fish by Raffaello Celommi
Figura by Guido Montauti
Still Life by Giovanni Gromo
Dogana by Gonsalvo Carelli
Blind orphan of Abruzzo by Raffaello Pagliaccetti
Portrait of Gaetano Braga by Costantino Barbella
Madonna and Baptism of Christ, ceramic attributed to Berardino Gentili
Holy Family, ceramic attributed to Candeloro Cappelletti
St Antony and Child Jesus, ceramic attributed to Liborio Grue
Landscape, maiolica attributed to Nicola Tommaso Grue

Notes

External links

Teramo
Art museums and galleries in Abruzzo